Tyrant (foaled 1882) was an American Thoroughbred racehorse who came from California to win the 1885 Belmont Stakes, a prestigious race at Jerome Park Racetrack on the U. S. East Coast that would become the third leg of the U.S. Triple Crown series.

Background
Tyrant was bred by Gen. William Harding at his Belle Meade Stud in Tennessee. He was initially purchased as a yearling for $300 by Mr. S. D. Bruce of Kentucky but who a year later sold him to James B. A. Haggin who brought the colt to his Rancho Del Paso Stud in Sacramento County, California.

In 1884, the two-year-old Tyrant was conditioned for racing on the Rancho Del Paso's three-quarter mile training track but it was decided that the colt was not yet ready for the rigors of competition and Tyrant only began his racing career as a three-year-old in 1885.

Tyrant's easy win in the Withers Stakes marked the first time that a California horse with its California trainer had won a major race for three-year-olds on the East Coast.

Racing at age four, Tyrant won the Distillers' Stakes at the Kentucky Association track in Lexington.

Stud career
Retired to stud at his owner's Rancho Del Paso, Tyrant met with limited success as a sire. Among his offspring, Tyrant's most successful runners included The Manxman, winner of the 1898 Carter Handicap.

Pedigree

References

1882 racehorse births
Thoroughbred racehorses
Racehorses bred in Tennessee
Racehorses trained in the United States
American racehorses